Iyom Josephine Anenih (born 6 July 1948) was appointed Nigerian minister of Women Affairs on 6 April 2010, when Acting President Goodluck Jonathan announced his new cabinet.

Biography 
Born in Sokoto in 1948, she moved frequently as her father, a civil servant with the Public Works Department, served postings in States all over Nigeria. She was born and into a Christian family.
She completed her secondary education at Queen's College, Lagos.
Studying Law, she received a B.Ed, LLB, and B.L. from the University of Ife (1974/75) and the University of Benin.

Her husband, Tony Anenih (1933–2018) was appointed Minister of Works in 1999 in President Olusegun Obasanjo's first cabinet.

She was the chairperson of the Federation of Women Lawyers from 1994 to 2000, and was the first National Woman Leader of the People's Democratic Party (PDP) from 1999 to 2005.
In April 2002, she said that implementation of the Sharia legal system in Kano State had ensured the promotion of women's rights as dictated by Islam.
She was a Special Adviser on Women Affairs to President Obasanjo until 2006.

She was one of the founder of the Women Foundation Nigeria (WFN), an organization that helps Nigerian women in exchanging views on global women's issues and to help empower women in politics. She is a member of the Gender Electoral and Constitutional Memoranda Committee, which aims to incorporate women's perspectives in Nigeria's Electoral Laws and reforms.

References 

Living people
1948 births
Federal ministers of Nigeria
Gender equality
National Working Committee people
Women's ministers
Queen's College, Lagos alumni
Obafemi Awolowo University alumni
University of Benin (Nigeria) alumni
People from Sokoto
21st-century Nigerian politicians
21st-century Nigerian women politicians
Women government ministers of Nigeria